Pleurotomella buccinoides is a species of sea snail, a marine gastropod mollusk in the family Raphitomidae.

Distribution
This marine species is endemic to Australia and occurs off New South Wales.

References

 Shuto, T. "New turrid taxa from the Australian waters." Mem. Fac. Sci. Kyushu Univ. Serie D Geol 25 (1983): 16.

External links
 

buccinoides
Gastropods described in 1983
Gastropods of Australia